Hoppity Hooper is an American animated television series produced by Jay Ward, and sponsored by General Mills, originally broadcast on ABC from September 12, 1964 until 1967.  The series was produced in Hollywood by Jay Ward and Bill Scott, with animation done in Mexico City by Gamma Productions.

Premise
The three main characters were Hoppity Hooper, a plucky frog, voiced by Chris Allen; Waldo P. Wigglesworth, a patent medicine-hawking fox, voiced by Hans Conried, who posed as Hoppity's long-lost uncle in the pilot episode; and Fillmore, a bear wearing a Civil War hat and coat, (poorly) playing his bugle, voiced by Bill Scott (with Alan Reed portraying the character in the pilot). The stories revolved around the three main characters, who lived in Foggy Bog, Wisconsin, seeking their fortune together through different jobs or schemes, usually ending in misadventure.

Each story consisted of four short cartoons, one aired at the beginning and end of each episode, with the four-part story shown over two consecutive episodes. Much like Jay Ward's previous series The Rocky and Bullwinkle Show, Hoppity Hooper used pun-based titles to identify each upcoming segment and a narrator (voiced by Paul Frees and later by William Conrad), who often interacted with the characters and broke the fourth wall. Interspersed were recycled second features from the earlier series Peabody's Improbable History, Fractured Fairy Tales, Aesop and Son and The World of Commander McBragg. In later syndicated runs, each four-part story was assembled into a single half-hour episode.

Background
Early versions of Waldo and Fillmore, under the names "Sylvester Fox" and "Oski Bear," were included in the proposed series The Frostbite Falls Revue, the unsold concept that would eventually form the basis of Rocky and Bullwinkle. The two-part pilot was produced in 1960 and featured Alan Reed as Fillmore. Production did not begin on the series until September 1964, after Rocky and Bullwinkle had ended its run; by 1964, Reed was committed to the role of Fred Flintstone on The Flintstones and was unavailable, and Bill Scott took over the role; the pilot aired as produced with Reed's voice as the first two segments.

The series was broadcast first-run by ABC and NBC on their Saturday morning schedule.  The series was later syndicated to local television stations under the title Uncle Waldo's Cartoon Show, beginning in 1965.

As of 2022, Wildbrain owns syndication rights to the series.

Episodes
Over the course of three seasons, 52 episodes were broadcast with two segments of Hoppity Hooper each.  With two exceptions (as noted), each story line consisted of four episodes (or four shorts – making 27 stories told over 104 segments).

Season 1 (1964–1965)

Season 2 (1965–1966)

Season 3 (1966–1967)

Production
Producers: Jay Ward, Bill Scott
Directors: Pete Burness, Bill Hurtz, Lew Keller
Writers: Chris Jenkyns, Bill Scott
Film Editor: Skip Craig
Designers: Sam Clayberger, Roy Morita, and Shirley Silvey
Animation by Gamma Productions S.A. de C.V.
Production Director: Harvey Siegel
Assistant Director: Jaime Torres
Animation Supervisor: Sam S. Kai
Layout Supervisor: Joe Montell
Executive Producers: Peter Piech, Ponsonby Britt, O.B.E. (pseudonym of Jay Ward and Bill Scott)
A Jay Ward Production
In cooperation with Producers Associates of Television, inc.

Voice cast
Chris Allen - Hoppity Hooper
Hans Conried - Uncle Waldo P. Wigglesworth
Alan Reed (eps. 1) and Bill Scott (eps. 2-52) – Fillmore Bear
Paul Frees (eps. 1–50) and Bill Conrad (eps. 51–52) – Narrator

Home video
Hoppity Hooper was released in three separate volumes on VHS in the early 1990s. Volume One was released on DVD in the 2000s (the copyrights for each of these three releases were in question at the time of their respective releases).

In 2008, Mill Creek Entertainment released episodes 1–6 and episodes 8–11 as part of the Giant 600 Cartoon Collection.  They also re-released these episodes as part of the Super 300 Cartoon Collection in 2009. Also in 2008, Mill Creek re-released episodes 1-6 as part of the 200 Classic Cartoons: Collectors Edition.

References

External links

Hoppity Hooper at Don Markstein's Toonopedia. Archived from the original on February 6, 2016.
"Fight Fiercely, Young Teddy!" - The Hoppity Hooper theme

1960s American animated television series
1964 American television series debuts
1967 American television series endings
American children's animated comedy television series
Jay Ward Productions
American Broadcasting Company original programming
NBC original programming
Animated television series about frogs
Television shows set in Wisconsin
General Mills